The third season of The Models (previously titled "Mongolia's Next Top Model") premiered on 24 October 2021 on Edutainment TV and streamed on the VOO App. This is the third season of the series that received notable changes including the new host Urantsetseg Ganbold who replaced Nora Dagva.

The prizes for this cycle were: a cash prize of ₮20.000.000 (about US$7,600) and a 6-night trip to Maldives courtesy by Cruise Tour Mongolia.

The winner was the 21-year-old Hanna Buyankhishig from Ulaanbaatar.

Contestants
(Ages stated are at start of contest)

Episode summaries

Episode 1
Original airdate: 

This was the casting episode. The 20 semifinalists had a runway show and a photoshoot in a tracking field. At panel they were narrowed down to the top 16. After the casting, they move into their model villa, where they will live throughout the competition.
	
Challenge winner: Dieu Erkhembayar
Eliminated: Amy O., Lynkhua Baatar, Nami O. & Nomio E.

Episode 2
Original airdate: 
	
Immune from elimination: Darikona De., Dieu Erkhembayar, Khatnaa Naranbyamba, Mendy Amgalanbaatar, Naraa Ganbaatar, Nuna Tungalagtamir, Tsolmon Gantulga, Undrakh Tumurchudur
First call-out: Tsolmon Gantulga
Bottom eight: Anu Timüüjin, Akuna Khatanbaatar, Dino Beina, Hanna Buyankhishig, Khulanii Gansukh, Sondor Ganzul, Undraa Mönkhbaatar, Zaya Bagahuu
Eliminated: Undraa Mönkhbaatar

Episode 3
Original airdate: 

First call-out: Dino Beina
Bottom two: Mendy Amgalanbaatar & Undrakh Tumurchudur
Eliminated: Mendy Amgalanbaatar

Episode 4
Original airdate: 
	
Challenge winner: Anu Timüüjin
Immune from elimination: Akuna Khatanbaatar, Darikona De., Dieu Erkhembayar, Dino Beina, Khatnaa Naranbyamba, Nuna Tungalagtamir & Sondor Ganzul
First call-out: Dieu Erkhembaya
First Eliminated: Khulanii Gansukh
Bottom two: Anu Timüüjin & Zaya Bagahuu
Eliminated: Anu Timüüjin

Episode 5
Original airdate: 
	
First call-out: Hanna Buyankhishig
Bottom two: Darikona De. & Undrakh Tumurchudur
Eliminated: Darikona De.

Episode 6
Original airdate: 
	
Challenge winner: Naraa Ganbaatar
Immune from elimination: Dieu Erkhembayar, Dino Beina, Khatnaa Naranbyamba, Nuna Tungalagtamir, Tsolmon Gantulga & Undrakh Tumurchudur
First call-out: Khatnaa Naranbyamba
Bottom two: Naraa Ganbaatar & Zaya Bagahuu
Eliminated: Naraa Ganbaatar

Episode 7
Original airdate: 
	
Challenge winner: Nuna Tungalagtamir
First call-out: Akuna Khatanbaatar
Bottom two: Tsolmon Gantulga & Undrakh Tumurchudur
Eliminated: Undrakh Tumurchudur

Episode 8
Original airdate: 
	
Challenge winner: Hanna Buyankhishig
Immune from elimination: Akuna Khatanbaatar, Dino Beina, Nuna Tungalagtamir, Tsolmon Gantulga & Zaya Bagahuu
Bottom two: Dieu Erkhembayar & Sondor Ganzul
Eliminated: Sondor Ganzul

Episode 9
Original airdate: 
	
Challenge winner: Tsolmon Gantulga
First call-out: Tsolmon Gantulga
Bottom two: Akuna Khatanbaatar & Dino Beina
Eliminated: Akuna Khatanbaatar & Dino Beina

Episode 10
Original airdate: 
	
Challenge winner: Hanna Buyankhishig
Immune from elimination: Dieu Erkhembayar, Khatnaa Naranbyamba & Tsolmon Gantulga
Bottom three: Hanna Buyankhishig, Nuna Tungalagtamir & Zaya Bagahuu
Eliminated: Nuna Tungalagtamir

Episode 11
Original airdate: 
	
Challenge winner: Dieu Erkhembayar
First call-out: Tsolmon Gantulga
Eliminated: Dieu Erkhembayar & Zaya Bagahuu

Episode 12: Finale

Original airdate: 
	
Final three: Hanna Buyankhishig, Khatnaa Naranbyamba & Tsolmon Gantulga
Eliminated: Tsolmon Gantulga
Final two: Hanna Buyankhishig & Khatnaa Naranbyamba
Winner: Hanna Buyankhishig

Result table

 The contestant was immune from elimination
 The contestant won the best photo
 The contestant was in danger of elimination
 The contestant was eliminated
 The contestant won the competition

Photo shoots

Episode 1 photo shoot: Posing at a track field (casting) 
Episode 2 photo shoot: Futuristic on stilts in pairs
Episode 3 photo shoot: Posing with a MOZO Car
Episode 4 photo shoot: Food & beverage ads in pairs
Episode 5 photo shoot: Futuristic Marie Antoinette for Oroblu
Episode 6 photo shoot: Cyberpunk players for VOO
Episode 7 photo shoot: Posing on a raft by a lake
Episode 8 photo shoot: Dansran jewelry beauty shot in B/W
Episode 9 photo shoot: Alice in Wonderland in a dollhouse
Episode 10 photo shoot: Train travellers for BABA
Episode 11 photo shoot: Michael Kors BGB catalogue
Episode 12 photo shoot: Posing at the end of the runway with golden background

Notes

References

	

Mongolian-language television shows
Mongolia's Next Top Model